Irvington may refer to:

Places 
 United States (cities, towns, villages, and unincorporated communities)
 Irvington, Alabama, an unincorporated community in Mobile County, Alabama
 Irvington, Illinois, a village in Washington County, Illinois
 Irvington Township, Washington County, Illinois, a township in Washington County, Illinois
 Irvington, Iowa
 Irvington, Kentucky, a city in Breckinridge County, Kentucky
 Irvington, Nebraska, an unincorporated community in Douglas County, Nebraska
 Irvington, New Jersey, a township in Essex County, New Jersey
 Irvington, New York, a village in the Town of Greenburgh, Westchester County, New York
 Irvington, Virginia, a town in Lancaster County, Virginia
 Irvington, Wisconsin, an unincorporated community in the Town of Menomonie, Dunn County, Wisconsin

 United States (neighborhoods or districts)
 Irvington, Baltimore, neighborhood in the Southwest District of Baltimore, Maryland
 Irvington, Fremont, California, a historical town; now a district of the City of Fremont, Alameda County, California
 Irvington, Portland, Oregon, a neighborhood in the Northeast section of Portland, Oregon
 Irvington Historic District (Indianapolis, Indiana), a historic neighborhood in Indianapolis, Indiana

Other 
 Irvington (BART station), in Fremont, California
 Irvington Community School, in the Irvington Historic District of Indianapolis, Indiana
 Irvington Public Schools, a school district in Irvington, New Jersey
 Irvington Town Hall, in Irvington, New York

See also 
 Irvington High School (disambiguation)
 Irvington Historic District (disambiguation)